South County High School, opened in September 2005, is a public high school in Lorton, Virginia and is part of the Fairfax County Public Schools system. The school mascot is "Stan" the Stallion and the school colors are forest green, navy blue, and silver. Common nicknames include "SoCo", "SCHS", and "South County".

History of South County 

In 2005, South County Secondary School became the first secondary school to open in Fairfax County in 32 years. The school was built on the grounds of the decommissioned District of Columbia Department of Corrections Lorton facility. With the construction of South County Middle School next to it in 2012 its designation was changed to that of a high school.

Current status 

South County High School serves grades 9–12. SCHS unofficially has a rivalry with Hayfield, West Springfield, and Lake Braddock, which are other schools in FCPS. South County's main building mirrors that of Westfield High School. In 2015, after extensive fundraising efforts led by the former Director of Student Activities, Leah Conte, the natural grass playing fields were replaced with synthetic turf.

The current high school's Student Government President is Zion Nuby, elected in April of 2021.

Administration
The next principal of South County High School will be Samuel Khoshaba, effective July 1, 2022. Khoshaba is the current principal of Western Branch Middle School in Chesapeake City Public Schools. He was also named the 2021 Middle School Principal of the Year by the Virginia Association of Secondary School Principals.

Demographics
In the 2018-2019 school year SCHS's student body was 40.09% White, 19.95% Black, 1.20% Asian, 15.75% Hispanic or Latino, and 5.66% other.

School safety report card

Academics 

South County (as of December 2018) has 206 full time staff, of which 142 are teachers. The school also has 2,142 computers to aid in teaching. SCHS is fully accredited with rates of 92 for English, 90 for History, 87 for Math, and 89 for Science in 2017-2018 (based on 2016-2017 testing).

Grading scale 
South County uses the FCPS grading scale.

Academic programs 
SCHS offers the following programs:

Advanced Placement (AP) 
South County offers Advanced Placement programs in the following subject areas:

Career and Transition Services

English for Speakers of Other Languages (ESOL)

South County athletics

Fall sports

 Cheerleading
 Varsity
 Junior Varsity
 Field Hockey
 Varsity
 Junior Varsity
 Football
 Varsity
 Junior Varsity
 Freshman
 Girls Volleyball
 Varsity
 Junior Varsity
 Freshman
 Cross Country
 Varsity
 Golf
 Varsity
 Dance
 Varsity

Varsity football 

South County's Varsity Football team is highly skilled and has gone to the playoffs many times including a state championship appearance in 2011 where they lost 20-10. In their 2015 season, the Stallions made it to state semi-finals losing to Westfield 40-8. In 2019, the Stallions defeated Westfield 28-21 in the state semi-finals to advance to their second state title game in school history. They defeated the Oscar Smith Tigers 14-13 to capture their first football state title in school history. In 2021, the Stallions made their third state championship appearance.

Winter sports

 Girls Basketball
 Varsity
 Junior Varsity
 Freshman
 Boys Basketball
 Varsity
 Junior Varsity
 Freshman
 Girls Gymnastics
 Varsity
 Indoor Track
 Varsity
 Swim and Dive
 Varsity
 Junior Varsity
 Freshman
 Wrestling
 Varsity
 Junior Varsity
 Freshman

Varsity boys basketball 
The boys varsity basketball team won the 2018 VHSL 6A State Championship with a 63-47 victory over Western Branch High School. Having another remarkable season, the boys varsity basketball team went 27-3 and made it to the state finals. Due to COVID-19, the game was never played and the team was announced as 2020 VHSL 6A State co-champions with Centreville High School.

Spring sports

 Girls Soccer
 Varsity
 Junior Varsity
 Boys Soccer
 Varsity
 Junior Varsity
 Girls Lacrosse
 Varsity
 Junior Varsity
 Boys Lacrosse
 Varsity
 Junior Varsity
 Outdoor Track
 Varsity
 Baseball
 Varsity
 Junior Varsity
 Crew
 Varsity
 Softball
 Varsity
 Junior Varsity
 Boys Tennis
 Varsity
 Girls Tennis
 Varsity

South County after school programs 
SCHS offers many different clubs and after school programs.

Clubs

Notable alumni 
Andi Sullivan, U.S. Women's National Soccer Team
Oren Burks, LB for the Green Bay Packers
Trevor Stewart, American track athlete

References

External links 
Official site
Stallion Athletics
SCHS Bands
SCHS Crew
South County Theatre

Public high schools in Virginia
High schools in Fairfax County, Virginia
School buildings completed in 2005
Educational institutions established in 2005
2005 establishments in Virginia